Nzema Kotoko Fotball Club is a Ghanaian professional football club based in Nzema in the Western Region of Ghana. The club currently competes in Zone Two of the Division One League which is the second tier of the football league system in Ghana, and the MTN FA Cup. They are rivals with city neighbours Karela United.

History 
The club was founded in 2013 and currently plays in the Ghana Division One League. In 2020, the club's top goal scorer, Agyenim Boateng Mensah was transferred to Dreams.

Grounds 
In February 2021, the club started playing the home matches at Akoon Park in Tarkwa, the home grounds of Ghana Premier League side Medeama.

Support

Rivalries 
Due being located in the Western Region of Ghana, the club's rivals is their neighbours Karela United (currently in the Ghana Premier League) which is also within the Nzema zone.

References

External links 

 Nzema Kotoko on Soccerway
 Nzema Kotoko on Global Sports Archive

Football clubs in Ghana
Association football clubs established in 2013
2013 establishments in Ghana